Polycitoridae is a family of tunicates belonging to the order Aplousobranchia.

Genera:
 Archidistoma Garstang, 1891
 Brevicollus Kott, 1990
 Cystodytes Drasche, 1884
 Eucoelium Savigny, 1816
 Eudistoma Caullery, 1909
 Exostoma Kott, 1990
 Millarus Monniot & Monniot, 1988
 Polycitor Renier, 1804
 Polycitorella Michaelsen, 1924
 Rhombifera Pérès, 1956
 Salix Kott, 2005

References

Aplousobranchia